Mao Fujita (born 28 November 1998) is a Japanese pianist.

Life
Mao Fujita was born 28 November 1998 in Tokyo and began learning piano at age three. He studied piano with Ms. Yuka Matsuyama and Prof. Gen Matsuyama from age 9 until at least 2016. He is a graduate of Tokyo College of Music High School.  he is studying as a special scholarship student in the Piano Performance for Talented Students Division at the Tokyo College of Music.

His first appearance on the major international competitions was in 2010, where he received the 1st prize in the Junior Section of The World Classic in Taiwan. He won several piano competitions over the following years, including the Rosario Marciano International Piano Competition in Vienna in 2013 and the 27th Clara Haskil International Piano Competition in Switzerland in 2017.

He participated in the Gina Bachauer International Young Artists Piano Competition in 2016 and won 3rd prize.

Fujita won the Second Prize and Silver Medal at the XVI International Tchaikovsky Competition piano category in 2019.

Discography
 Beethoven - Rachmaninov - Miyoshi (Mao Fujita) Naxos Crescendo NYCC-10001, 2013
 Beethoven: Piano Sonata No. 14 - Wagner/Liszt: Tannhauser Overture - Prokofiev Piano Sonata (Mao Fujita) Naxos Japan NYCC-27296, 2015
 Passage (Mao Fujita) Naxos Japan NYCC-27306, 2018 
 Paderewski: Piano Masterpieces (Yukio Yokoyama, Mao Fujita, Yukine Kuroki) Naxos Japan NYCC-27307, 2018
 Listen to the Universe – Mao Fujita with Masahiko Enkoji, 2019
 Chopin: Impromptus & Scherzos (Mao Fujita) Naxos Japan, 2020
 Mozart: The Complete Piano Sonatas (Mao Fujita) Sony Classical G010004812009Z, 2022

References

External links
 Mao Fujita - Sony Classical
 Mao Fujita - NAXOS
 Mao Fujita - Intermusica
 Japan Arts Artist Page
 
 
 
 
 

1998 births
21st-century classical pianists
21st-century Japanese male musicians
Japanese classical pianists
Japanese male classical pianists
Living people
Musicians from Tokyo